Deans Creek is a river in the U.S. State of New York.

References

Rivers of Oneida County, New York